Metamasius is a genus of bromeliad weevils in the beetle family Dryophthoridae. There are more than 120 described species in Metamasius.

See also
 List of Metamasius species

References

Further reading

External links

 

Dryophthorinae
Articles created by Qbugbot